Itumbiara is a genus of longhorn beetles of the subfamily Lamiinae, containing the following species:

 Itumbiara crinicornis (Germar, 1824)
 Itumbiara cuici Galileo & Martins, 1997
 Itumbiara denudata Galileo & Martins, 2005
 Itumbiara explanata (Bates, 1885)
 Itumbiara fimbriata (Bates, 1881)
 Itumbiara picticollis (Bates, 1881)
 Itumbiara picticornis (Bates, 1872)
 Itumbiara plumosa (Bates, 1881)
 Itumbiara subdilatata (Bates, 1872)
 Itumbiara taigaiba Martins & Galileo, 1992

References

 
Cerambycidae genera